Jarijari were an indigenous Australian people whose traditional territory was located in the Mallee region of Victoria.

Name
Jarijari was the tribe's word for "no", it being customary for the Murray tribes of this area to be identified by the negative used in their respective languages.

Language
The Jarijari language has been classified as belonging to the Lower Murray Areal Group, together with Kureinji, and to be similar to that spoken by the Watiwati, but reports are contradictory and may not be speaking of the same people.

Country
Their southern frontier ran sound along Hopetoun Lake Korong and Pine Plains. The northern frontier bordered on Redcliffs.

Neighbouring tribes were the Wergaia to the south, the Latjilatji to the west and the Dadi Dadi to the east.

Riverine diet
The classification of species by Blandowski was flawed, in that he made several species out of distinct life phases in just a few. At least 3 were reclassified and renamed under a different taxonomy: flathead gudgeon, the Jarijari collundera:
Australian smelt (Retropinna semoni) and
Murray hardyhead (Craterocephalus fluviatilis)

 tandan or dew-/jewfish, in Jarijari called kenaru, was considered a great delicacy, and its consumption by young men was forbidden.
 Bony bream (Nematalosa erebi). Blandowski who was the first to identify it scientifically, called this Megalope Caillentassart, - manur in Jarijari.  This was a tribal staple throughout June–July, except for women, for whom it was taboo, since it was thought to have aphrodisiacal properties, given its nourishing adiposity. It was also a grave marker, positioned in a way that pointed in the direction of the presumed murderer.
 silver perch known as baggack. Blandowski used Thomas Mitchell 's nomenclature and referred to it as Cernua Bidyana.
 Cernua Eadesii, native aname buruitjall.
 Cernua Nicholsonia, or in Jarijari karpa.
 Cernua Ifflaensis, or bipe purritjall.
 Cernua Wilkiensis, or in Jarijari mallupit. A billabong species.
 Kohna Mackennce, or kohn.
 Turruitja Achenson,  or turrultje. Both a Murray and billabong species.
 Jerrina Dobreensis, or jorrin. Mainly fished from billabongs.
 Poko. Only the Jarijari term was given for this species of nigh transparent, greenish spotted trout, which however was not specific to the Murray, but also found in the Yarra River.
 Uteranka Irvingi or uterank. Also a Yarra fish, not unknown to the Murray, though rare there. Preyed on largely by other fish.
 Oristes Macquariensis, or yaturr. This was a major staple of thed Jarijari, even in winter where it would be hunted at night by firelight when the flooding led the cod to 'sleep' in the nooks of logs along the bank. In summer, the Jarijari would dive to the bottom of the Murray to spear it.
 Gristes Peelil, or barnta,
 Collundera Miitteriana,, in Jarijari collundera. A billabong fish.
 Loetj, a billabong fish, no longer than 2 inches.
 Rurrina Macadamia, or koerin/kurrin, a bluish-green billabong fish that mostly preyed on crayfish.
 Brosmius Bleasdalii, or paltk, a billabong fish, but found also in the Yarra.
 Cernua Nicholsonia, or karpa.

History
The Blandowski Expedition (1856-1857) was one of the first documented European encounters with the people.  Blandowski described the Yarree as his "good friends". Notably one of William Blandowski's 1857 illustrations depicted traditional Jari Jari recreation.  Peter Beveridge, in his 1883 account "The Aborigines of Victoria and Riverina" recorded some of the tribe's dreamtime beliefs, associated with these Murray tribes of which the Jarijari were one.

Blandowski ended his account with a general statement on the recent state of these Murray riverine tribes:
On the whole I have but to make the most deplorable statements concerning our natives. Extermination proceeds so rapidly, that the regions of the Lower Murray are already depopulated, and a quietude reigns there which saddens the traveller who visited those districts a few years ago.

Alternative names
 Jere jere
 Nyerri-nyerri
 Yairy-yairy
 Yari-yari
 Yariki-luk. (exonym applied to the Jarijari by the Wotjobaluk)
 Yarree Yarree, Yarre-yarre, Yerri-yerri, Yerre-yerre, Yerry-yerry

Source:

Some words
 yaturr. (Murray cod)
 barnta. (Trout cod).

Notes

Citations

Sources

Aboriginal peoples of Victoria (Australia)
History of Victoria (Australia)